Emmanuel Matadi (born 15 April 1991) is Liberian sprinter.  Matadi has represented Liberia in the 2016 Summer Olympics, the 2017 World Athletics Championships, and the 2020 Summer Olympics.

Matadi attended the University of Louisville before transferring to Minnesota State University, Mankato. At MNSU, Matadi won national titles in the 100m and 200m. He also holds Liberia's  national records in the 60m and 100m. Internationally, Matadi won bronze in the 200 meters at the 2016 African Championships and made his Olympic debut while competing for Liberia at the 2016 Summer Olympics in the 100m and 200m. He was the flag bearer for Liberia in the Parade of Nations.

In the 2017 World Championships, Matadi was one of three Africans to advance to the semifinals of the 100m in London.

Personal bests
Outdoor
100 meters – 9.98 (+1.1 m/s, Port-of-Spain 2022)  NR
200 meters – 20.33 (+1.5 m/s, San Antonio 2022) 

Indoor
60 meters – 6.52 (Louisville 2022) NR
200 meters – 21.13 (Albuquerque 2016)

International competitions

References

External links

All-Athletics

1991 births
Living people
Liberian male sprinters
Sportspeople from Monrovia
Athletes (track and field) at the 2016 Summer Olympics
Athletes (track and field) at the 2020 Summer Olympics
Olympic athletes of Liberia
World Athletics Championships athletes for Liberia

Minnesota State University, Mankato alumni